Sarah Spiegel is an American singer and actress who specializes in the Great American Songbook style. She toured for years with the Louis Prima Jr. band, Louis Prima Jr. and the Witnesses, and now performs as a solo artist in concerts and recordings. She has appeared as an actress in television shows such as NCIS, King of Queens, and Boston Public.

Early life
Spiegel was born in Long Branch, New Jersey, to Mel and Fran Spiegel.  Growing up in Belmar, New Jersey, she studied tap and jazz dancing.  She studied acting at the Spring Lake (New Jersey) Theatre Company, where she performed in such plays as Godspell, A Midsummer Night's Dream, and Scrooge.  At 14, Spiegel moved with her parents to Jupiter, Florida, where she attended Dreyfoos School of the Arts.  As a senior in high school, she was nominated for a foreign language scholarship from the Pathfinder High School Scholarship Awards.  Spiegel won a full scholarship to college and awards of excellence in performance competitions in the areas of solo and duet singing and acting.  She excelled at music and began singing locally, as well as appearing in plays, commercials, TV shows, and movies produced in Florida.  (She had already made her screen debut at 9 in a deleted bit part in Woody Allen's New York Stories.)

Career
Spiegel acted on television and  appeared solo in various nightclubs in Florida and around the country.  From 2008, she hosted industrial shows as a General Motors spokesperson with Kyle Gass.  In 2009, she joined the Louis Prima Jr. band, Louis Prima Jr. and the Witnesses, and toured America for four years as soloist with the band, appearing in Las Vegas, Manhattan, and Los Angeles stops on the tour, as well as in Italy, including an appearance in Louis Prima's family home town of Palermo, Italy.  She left the band in 2013 to pursue a successful solo career.  Since then, she has opened for Frank Sinatra Jr. and Nancy Sinatra and appeared in concert with Jeff Goldblum and Donny Most.

In November, 2020, Spiegel released a new album of songs from World War II, As Time Goes By, composed of songs from her stage production Through the Perilous Fight (We Never Stopped Singing).

Personal life
In 2012, Spiegel's mother Frances died as a result of medical malpractice.  Subsequently, Spiegel formed the Fran Spiegel Right to Know organization to promote awareness of medical malpractice.

References

Year of birth missing (living people)
Living people
American women singers
21st-century American actresses
People from Belmar, New Jersey
People from Long Branch, New Jersey
Singers from New Jersey